Reuben E. Brigety II (born September 7, 1973) is an American diplomat and academic who has served as the United States ambassador to South Africa since 2022. He was the vice-chancellor and president of the University of the South, in Sewanee, Tennessee, from 2020 to 2021.

Previously Brigety served as the dean of the Elliott School of International Affairs at George Washington University. Prior to that, Brigety has served as United States ambassador to the African Union, as a deputy assistant secretary of state, and as permanent representative to the United Nations Economic Commission for Africa.

Early life and education

A native of Jacksonville, Florida, Brigety is the son of Reuben Brigety, a physician, and Barbara Brigety, an educator and school administrator. He graduated from Sandalwood High School as the salutatorian. He applied to the United States Naval Academy, and was appointed there as part of the Class of 1995. At the academy, served as the Midshipman Brigade Commander during his senior year. He earned a Bachelor of Science in political science and graduated as a Distinguished Naval Graduate.

After graduation, he served in The Pentagon. Through the Thomas G. Pownall Scholarship awarded him from the Naval Academy Alumni Association, he spent two years at the University of Cambridge in England, where he obtained a Master of Philosophy in international relations. Brigety then served as an active duty U.S. naval officer, and entered training to be a submarine officer. Determined to dedicate himself to humanitarian causes, he requested and received an honorable discharge and returned to study at Cambridge and earned Doctor of Philosophy, also in international relations.

Career
From August 2003 to April 2009, Brigety was as an assistant professor of government and politics at George Mason University and at the American University School of International Service. In addition, he was a researcher with the Arms Division of Human Rights Watch from August 2001 through May 2003, conducting research missions in Afghanistan and Iraq.
From January 2007 to January 2008, Brigety served as a special assistant in the Bureau for Democracy, Conflict, and Humanitarian Assistance at the United States Agency for International Development. From January 2008 to November 2009, he served as director of the Sustainable Security Program at the Center for American Progress. From November 2008 to January 2009, he also served as a senior advisor for Development and Security to the U.S. Central Command Assessment Team in Washington and in Doha, Qatar.

From December 2009 to November 2011, he served as deputy assistant secretary of state in the Bureau of Population, Refugees, and Migration. In this capacity, he supervised U.S. refugee programs in Africa, managed U.S. humanitarian diplomacy with major international partners, and oversaw the development of international migration policy.

Brigety was appointed deputy assistant secretary of state in the Bureau of African Affairs on November 14, 2011, with responsibility for Southern African and Regional Security Affairs, and served in that capacity until September 3, 2013. From that date, he served as the appointed Representative of the United States of America to the African Union and Permanent Representative of the United States to the UN Economic Commission for Africa.

In August 2015, the George Washington University announced they had selected Ambassador Brigety for the dean of the Elliott School of International Affairs. He began serving in that capacity on October 1, 2015.

Brigety is a member of the International Institute for Strategic Studies, a life member of the Council on Foreign Relations, and a recipient of the council's International Affairs Fellowship.

Time at Sewanee
On February 28, 2020, he was announced as the next vice-chancellor and president of Sewanee: The University of the South, a position he began on June 17, 2020. (The vice-chancellor is Sewanee's chief academic officer, on the British model of higher education.) In one of his first actions as vice-chancellor, Brigety proposed new enforcement measures which were more consistent with the university's drug policy. This policy was announced alongside Brigety's four themes for what he deemed a "year of discernment." These themes are achieving national preeminence in academics, strengthening commitment to equality and inclusion, increased focus on global citizenship, and the economic development of the Domain to increase amenities.

The University of the South has perhaps the strongest historic connection to anti-Black racism and the Confederacy of any school in the South. It was founded in 1857 specifically to create a Southern university free of Northern influences. Its campus is studded with monuments to the Confederacy; both Jefferson Davis and Robert E. Lee were offered the vice-chancellorship after the Civil War.

Brigety was the first African American to serve as Sewanee's vice-chancellor, at a time when its student body was only 4% Black. He faced significant opposition from some white students, including repeated vandalism of his home. On February 7, 2021, Brigety gave a speech to the student body in which he described the vandalism, saying "The sanctity, the security and the dignity of my family are inviolate, and we are not leaving." A few weeks later, a group of Sewanee students were ordered to leave a men's lacrosse game against Emmanuel College for yelling racial epithets at non-white players on Emmanuel's team.

Nomination for South Africa Ambassadorship
On December 1, 2021, Brigety announced his resignation from Sewanee, effective December 21. Brigety stated his resignation was due to uncertainty surrounding a possible nomination to be the ambassador to South Africa. He was nominated for the post on February 4, 2022. Hearings were held on his nomination before the Senate Foreign Relations Committee on May 24, 2022. The committee favorably reported his nomination to the Senate floor on June 23, 2022. Brigety was confirmed by the Senate on July 21, 2022 via a vote of 55-40. He presented his credentials to President Cyril Ramaphosa on August 11, 2022.

Personal life
Brigety speaks Spanish, French, and Amharic.

Bibliography

References

Attribution

External links 

1973 births
Living people
Place of birth missing (living people)
20th-century African-American people
21st-century African-American people
21st-century American diplomats
African-American diplomats
Alumni of the University of Cambridge
Ambassadors of the United States to South Africa
People from Jacksonville, Florida
Representatives of the United States to the African Union
United States Naval Academy alumni